The Denel Vektor M1 60mm Mortar is a mortar manufactured by the South African firm Denel Land Systems for use by the South African Army and the Irish Defence Forces (since 2003). Around 100 were also sold to the Forces Armées Rwandaises in 1992, during the Rwandan Civil War.

References 

Infantry mortars
Cold War artillery of South Africa
Denel
60mm mortars